Harry Sage (March 16, 1864 – May 27, 1947), nicknamed "Doc", was a Major League Baseball catcher in 1890 for the Toledo Maumees of the American Association.  He was a native of Rock Island, Illinois.

In his only major league season, Sage played in 81 out of 132 games for the Maumees. A good defensive catcher, his .948 fielding percentage was above the league average of .925. He was a huge liability at bat, however, hitting a paltry .149 (41-for-275). He managed to contribute some offense, however. He walked 29 times to raise his on-base percentage to .235, scored 40 runs, hit two home runs and drove in 25.

Sage was a minor league manager of the Rock Island Islanders.

Sage died in his hometown of Rock Island, Illinois, at the age of 83.

References

External links
Baseball Reference.

1864 births
1947 deaths
19th-century baseball players
Major League Baseball catchers
Toledo Maumees players
Baseball players from Illinois
Sportspeople from Rock Island, Illinois
Pueblo Pastimes players
St. Paul Freezers players
Des Moines Hawkeyes players
Des Moines Prohibitionists players
Toledo Black Pirates players
Davenport Pilgrims players
Rochester Hop Bitters players
Lebanon Cedars players
Rock Island-Moline Twins players
Rock Island-Moline Islanders players
Paris Midlands players
Denison Tigers players